Kotelva is an urban-type settlement in Poltava Raion in Poltava Oblast in northeastern Ukraine, and formerly the administrative centre of Kotelva Raion prior to its abolition in 2020. Population:

Location 
Kotelva is in the northeastern area of forest on the left tributary of the Vorskla River, the Kotelva River. Kotelva is 66 km from Poltava on N12 and 35 km from the nearest train station.

History 
Two settlements of the Bandaryhynska culture dating back to the 12th and 10th centuries BC were found on the outskirts of Kotelva.

Kotelva was one of the earliest settlements of the Left-bank Hetmanate. The settlement emerged in the mid-16th century and in 1709 was temporarily included in Slobodian. The emergence of a new settlement on the left bank laid its development in both the political and religious areas.

Kotelva was first mentioned in writing in 1582 when Hetman Skalozub told it about the attack of the Crimean state units. In 1638, inhabitants of the town first attacked against the Polish authorities in the army of Hetman Pivtorakozhuka. For ten years, during the Khmelnytsky Uprising, Kotelva inhabitants participated in battles under the leadership of Bohdan Khmelnytsky. In the second half of the 17th century and in the first half of the 18th century Kotelva was a fortress protecting against attacks of Crimean and Nogai troops. In January 1709, Charles XII of Sweden spared the city. Later deceit town came under the direct jurisdiction of Grand Duchy of Moscow and entered into the Akhtyrsky regiment of Sloboda Ukraine. The church remained subordinate to the Kyiv Metropolis.

Subsequently, Kotelva rebuilt the castle in 1718. In 1722, the Akhtyrsky Regiment was excluded from Kyiv province and went into the Military College. In the 1732 census, Kotelva had a population of 3,877.

In 1743, another census was held. Kotelva now had 8,433 inhabitants. The town was given a coat of arms. In 1812, the Holy Trinity Church, its largest architectural monument, was built.

With a population around 20,000, Kotelva was one of the largest villages in Ukraine until 1930. At the time it had a large cottage industry, mainly involved in weaving. In 1979, the town had a population of 12,000.

Notable people
 Yuriy Fomenko, footballer
 Sydir Kovpak, partisan leader
 Valery Storozhik, actor

References 

Urban-type settlements in Poltava Raion
Akhtyrsky Uyezd
1582 in the Polish–Lithuanian Commonwealth
Populated places established in 1582
1582 establishments in Europe
1582 in Ukraine